Erysimum redowskii, synonym Erysimum pallasii, known as Pallas' wallflower, is a low shrub or mid shrub species from the Arctic. It has purple flowers that do not reflect UV.

Taxonomy
Erysimum redowskii was first described by Johann Anton Weinmann in 1810. A description of Cheiranthus pallasii was first published by Frederick Traugott Pursh in 1813. It was transferred to Erysimum as Erysimum pallasii by Merritt Lyndon Fernald in 1925. E. pallasii was considered to be a synonym of E. redowskii by Adolf Polatschek in 2010 and 2012 listings of Erysimum species. The synonymy is accepted by Plants of the World Online, .

Distribution

This wallflower has a circumpolar Arctic distribution. It is widespread in the Canadian Arctic Archipelago, and common in Greenland, Northwest Canada and Alaska.

Ecology
This species seems to be apomictic, since it is scarcely visited by insects and seed production is independent of flower visitors.

References

redowskii
Flora of the Arctic
Flora of Russia
Flora of Siberia
Flora of Finland
Flora of Norway
Flora of Sweden
Flora of Alaska
Flora of Canada
Flora without expected TNC conservation status